Gazoryctra pulcher is a moth of the family Hepialidae. It is known from the United States, including Colorado, New Mexico and Utah.

The wingspan is about 33 mm.

References

Moths described in 1865
Hepialidae
Moths of North America